Iznasen (Iznassen, Iznacen) is a Berber language, one of the Zenati languages. It is spoken in the extreme northeast of Morocco, in a speech area near the Berber languages of western Algeria.

References

Berber languages
Languages of Morocco